The Melodic Blue is the debut studio album by American rapper and record producer Baby Keem. It was released on September 10, 2021, by PGLang and Columbia Records, with Keem serving as the executive producer. The standard version of the album featured guest appearances by Kendrick Lamar, Travis Scott and Don Toliver; an updated version, released on September 22, features an additional guest appearance from Brent Faiyaz. The deluxe edition of The Melodic Blue, released on October 28, 2022, contained additional guest appearances from PinkPantheress and Lil Uzi Vert.

The Melodic Blue was supported by four singles, including "Durag Activity" with Scott and "Family Ties" with Lamar. "Durag Activity" peaked at number 85 on the Billboard Hot 100. "Family Ties" peaked at number 18 on the Hot 100 and won the Grammy Award for Best Rap Performance, marking Keem's first Grammy Award. The album received generally positive reviews from music critics and debuted at number five on the Billboard 200, earning 53,000 total album-equivalent units in its first week.

Release and promotion
On October 19, 2020, Baby Keem first teased the title of the album by adding its name and some of the tracks onto a hoodie, but confirmed the project's title on April 30, 2021. On August 31, 2021, Keem stated that he finished the album and said that it "has my best production / compositional work". Two days later, he confirmed that it would be released that month. On September 6, 2021, Labor Day, Keem confirmed the release date and revealed the cover art. Two days later, he revealed the tracklist. 

On September 22, the album was updated to include three songs: the already released singles "No Sense" and "Hooligan", and a reworked version of "Lost Souls" featuring vocals from Brent Faiyaz. The album's deluxe edition was released on October 28, 2022, with seven new tracks. To promote the album, Keem embarked on The Melodic Blue Tour, which spanned across North America and Europe from November 2021 to July 2022.

Lyrics and composition 
The Melodic Blue is full of washed-out synths, booming bass, and distorted beats. It is noted for featuring the first three collaborations between Keem and his cousin Kendrick Lamar, who plays the role of his elder brother in his featured tracks. They also marked the first new songs from Lamar since the release of Black Panther: The Album (2018). Some of the lyrics went viral as memes for their seemingly unusual content, eventually leading to Keem publicly claiming that he and Lamar created four new languages together while recording the album.

Critical reception

The Melodic Blue received generally positive reviews from music critics. At Metacritic, which assigns a normalized score out of 100 to ratings from publications, the album received an average score of 77 based on eleven reviews, indicating "generally favorable reviews".

In a five-star review, Ben Beaumont-Thomas of The Guardian compared Keem to a "pre-costume superhero learning to control the lightning that pours from his hands." He argued that The Melodic Blue was the best rap album of 2021 and praised Keem's "gift for vocal melody that promises so much to come." Will Dukes of Rolling Stone found Baby Keem to be "sharp, focused and easy to like." Luke Britton of NME called Keem a "rising star" who "shows his versatility and wide-ranging sound on confident, mostly self-produced project." Tomas Miriti Pacheo of SPIN described the album as "charismatic and hilarious" at times and praised Keem's production that was "often as bold as his lyrics." He highlighted, however, that some of the production, most notably on "South Africa" and "Gorgeous" felt oversaturated and had Keem sounding "imitative at best and grating at worst." 

In a lukewarm review, Dylan Green of Pitchfork writes that instead of making the album a confessional, Keem "uses the opportunity to expand his well-established fascination with trap and melody to feature-length—with mixed results." He lauded over his verse on "Family Ties", suggesting it being among the best of his career as he "triumphantly skips over horns and thudding 808s with a handful of flows and reminisces on childhood Popeyes trips while puffing out his chest." Green suggests that "The Melodic Blue falls apart when [Keem] starts experimenting. He aims for pop and R&B more often, sometimes landing on something fun and propulsive and other times sounding jarringly indistinct." He writes that throughout the album, Keem is "devoted to trying on other artist’s sounds when it would have benefited from more of Keem refining what already worked about his. An album this theatrical and expansive suggests Keem is aiming for the next level. He doesn’t have to fully open his mind and heart to be a great artist, but he does need to retain his own voice."

Track listing
These credits are adapted from Columbia Records and Sony Music Entertainment:

Notes
 All tracks are stylized in all lowercase. For example, "Family Ties" is stylized as "family ties".
 "Trademark USA" features uncredited additional vocals from Rosalía.
 "Vent" features uncredited additional vocals from Kendrick Lamar.

Sample credits
 "Pink Panties" contain samples from "Fuck..... Instagram", written by Michee Lebrun, as performed by Che Ecru.
 "Scapegoats" contains an uncredited sample from "Redemption", written by Josiah Wise, as performed by Serpentwithfeet; and uncredited samples from "Unlucky", written by Kan Wakan and Lindsay Olsen, as performed by Wakan.
 "Lost Souls contain uncredited samples from "Sex A Pill", written by Michee Lebrun, as performed by Che Ecru.
 "Cocoa" contains an uncredited sample from "Didn't We", written by Jimmy Webb, as performed by Irene Reid.
 "Scars" contains uncredited samples from "Love Lockdown" written by Kanye West, Jeffrey "Jeff" Bhasker, Jenny-Bea Englishman, Malik Jones, and LaNeah Menzies, as performed by West.
 "Booman" contains uncredited samples from "Yei Baa Gbe Wolo", written by Nii Morton and Sam Nortey, as performed by Hugh Masekela.
 "Highway 95" contains samples from "Killing Me Softly", written by Charles Fox and Norman Gimbel, as performed by Fugees.

Personnel 

 Derek "206Derek" Anderson – recording , mixing 
 Matt Schaeffer – recording 
 Johnny Kosich – assistant engineering , recording 
 Jake the Snake – assistant engineering 
 Scott Moore – assistant engineering 
 Curtis "Sircut" Bye – assistant engineering 
 Ray Donghwan Kim – assistant engineering 
 Jacob Bryant – assistant engineering 
 MixedByAli – mixing 
 James Hunt – mixing , recording 
 Nicolas De Porcel – mastering

Charts

Weekly charts

Year-end charts

Certifications

References

External links
 

2021 debut albums
Baby Keem albums
Columbia Records albums
Albums produced by Cardo (record producer)
Albums produced by DJ Dahi
Albums produced by Frank Dukes
Albums produced by FnZ
Albums produced by Rogét Chahayed
Albums produced by Sounwave
PGLang albums
West Coast hip hop albums